Pang Hok Liong (born 22 July 1957) is a Malaysian politician who has served the Member of Parliament (MP) for Labis since May 2018. He served as the Member of the Johor State Legislative Assembly (MLA) for Bekok from October 1990 to April 1995. He is a member of the Democratic Action Party (DAP), a component party of the Pakatan Harapan (PH) and formerly Pakatan Rakyat (PR) opposition coalitions.

Background
Pang born on 22 July 1957 at Labis, Segamat, Johor. He obtained his Masters of Law (LLM) from University College London and Barrister-At-Law of Lincoln's Inn, London. He is an Advocate and Solicitor of the High Courts of Malaya and practicing lawyer since 19 August 1986 currently practicing in C C Aiyathurai & Co., Segamat.

Politics
Pang previously contested for the Segamat seat in 2004 and 2008 general elections but had lost both the contests to Subramaniam Sathasivam from Malaysian Indian Congress (MIC) of Barisan Nasional (BN). He did not participate in the 2013 general elections.

In the 2018 general election, Pang was finally elected to the MP for the Labis constituency, winning 16,977 of the 32,578 votes cast. He created history for winning the traditional Malaysian Chinese Association (MCA)-BN stronghold for the first time by defeating the Deputy Minister of International Trade and Industry then, Chua Tee Yong.

Election results

References

External links

Living people
1957 births
People from Johor
Malaysian politicians of Chinese descent
20th-century Malaysian lawyers
Democratic Action Party (Malaysia) politicians
Members of the Dewan Rakyat
Members of the Johor State Legislative Assembly
Alumni of the University of London
Members of Lincoln's Inn
21st-century Malaysian politicians
21st-century Malaysian lawyers